Kléber Piot (20 October 1920 – 5 January 1990) was a French cyclist. He rode in the 1947 and 1948 Tour de France. He finished in third place in the 1945 Paris–Roubaix.

References

External links

1920 births
1990 deaths
French male cyclists
Sportspeople from Saint-Denis, Seine-Saint-Denis
Cyclists from Île-de-France